This is a list of notable events in country music that took place in 2015.

Events
 January 15 – Parodist Cledus T. Judd announces his retirement from the performing aspect of the music business.
 February 27 – Carrie Underwood and Mike Fisher give birth to their son, Isaiah Michael Fisher.
 March 4 – Shania Twain announces that her Rock This Country tour will be her last but that she intends to continue releasing albums
 April – A new syndicated radio program, American Country Countdown Rewind with Bob Kingsley, consisting of Kingsley-hosted ACC programs from 1990–2005, is announced by Nash FM (the media brand and network of country music stations owned by Cumulus Media). The first programs aired the weekend of May 2.
 May 26 – Radio consultant Keith Hill is criticized when stating in an interview that music stations should limit the airplay of female country artists. The story, dubbed Tomato-gate is further ignited when Hill compares female artists to that of "tomatoes in a salad". In response, Sara Evans, Miranda Lambert, Martina McBride, and Jennifer Nettles criticize Hill's comments via social media.
 June 15 – Country Weekly is rebranded as Nash Country Weekly, as part of a co-branding with Nash FM's radio product.
 June 19 – Almost a year after successfully recovering from cervical cancer, Joey Martin Feek of Joey + Rory is diagnosed with stage IV colorectal cancer.
 June 22 – With "Love Me Like You Mean It", Kelsea Ballerini becomes the first female artist to send her debut single to No. 1 on Country Airplay since Carrie Underwood did in 2006, and the first female artist to do so on an independent label.
 July 9 – Luke Bryan causes controversy in an interview with "HITS Double Daily" for implying that Outlaw country artists (particularly Waylon Jennings, Merle Haggard, and Willie Nelson) spent their career "laying in the gutter, strung out on drugs." Bryan would later call Jennings' widow Jessi Colter, as well as Haggard's son, Ben, to apologize.
 July 18 – "Girl Crush" by Little Big Town makes country music history by breaking the record of weeks spent at number 1 by a group of three or more members, surpassing the current record holders The Browns and their song The Three Bells.
 July 20 – Miranda Lambert and Blake Shelton announce their divorce after four years of marriage.
 August 3 – Reba McEntire announces the separation from long-time husband and manager Narvel Blackstock. Although they will be ending their marriage, they will continue to support one another professionally.
 September 25 – Kenny Rogers announces his plans to retire following a Christmas album and a 2016 farewell tour
 September 27 – Producer Dave Brainard is hospitalized after being found unconscious with a broken jaw from a beating.
October – Joey Martin Feek of Joey + Rory  ends treatment  for stage IV colorectal cancer after treatments fail to control growth of tumors.
 November 2 – Chris Cagle announces his retirement from the music business.
 November 4 - Chris Stapleton becomes an overnight sensation after his performance with Justin Timberlake of "Tennessee Whiskey" and "Drink You Away" at the Country Music Association Awards; the performance is considered the best of the show, and one of the best performances in CMA history. Stapleton wins New Artist, Male Vocalist and Album of the Year for Traveller.
 November 9 – Joey Martin Feek of Joey and Rory enters Hospice care after terminal cancer diagnosis

Top hits of the year
The following songs placed within the Top 20 on the Hot Country Songs, Country Airplay or Canada Country charts in 2015:

Singles released by American artists

Singles released by Canadian artists

Top new album releases
The following albums placed on the Top Country Albums charts in 2015:

Other top albums

Deaths
 January 2 – Little Jimmy Dickens, 94, Grand Ole Opry member best known for "May the Bird of Paradise Fly Up Your Nose", "Take an Old Cold Tater (and Wait)", and standing at only 4.2 feet tall, as well as for his cameos in videos by artists such as Brad Paisley and Vince Gill. (cardiac arrest) 
 January 12 – A. J. Masters, 64, singer-songwriter (prostate cancer)
 January 16 – Dixie Hall, 80, bluegrass songwriter and wife of Country Music Hall of Fame member Tom T. Hall (brain tumor)
 January 17 – Don Harron, 90, Canadian comedian and playwright best known to country audiences as "Charlie Farquharson" on television's Hee Haw (cancer).
 March 9 – Wayne Kemp, 74, writer of Johnny Cash's "One Piece at a Time" among others; also a recording artist for MCA Nashville (various ailments)
 April 30 – Steven Goldmann, 53, music video director who directed a plethora of videos for many acts in the 90's and 2000's.  (cancer)
 May 18 – Elbert West, 46, singer-songwriter
 June 11 – Jim Ed Brown, 81, Grand Ole Opry star and member of The Browns (cancer)
 July 20 – Wayne Carson, 72, writer of Elvis Presley's "Always on My Mind," later covered by Willie Nelson
 July 22 – Daron Norwood, 49, country singer from the 1990s
 July 29 – Buddy Emmons, 78, steel guitarist
 July 30 – Lynn Anderson, 67, singer best known for the 1970 crossover hit "Rose Garden." (heart attack)
 August 4 – Billy Sherrill, 78, record producer best known for his work with George Jones and Tammy Wynette
 September 4 – Hal Willis, 82, Canadian singer-songwriter, best known for the song "The Lumberjack"
 September 25 – Hugh Wright, 63, drummer for Boy Howdy (natural causes)
 October 6 – Billy Joe Royal, 73, country and rock singer best known for his hits "Down in the Boondocks" and "Tell It Like It Is"
 October 17 – John Jennings, 62, record producer and guitarist best known for his work with Mary Chapin Carpenter (kidney cancer)
 November 2 – Tommy Overstreet, 78, country singer from the 1970s
 November 8 – Charlie Dick, 81, widower of Patsy Cline who helped keep alive her legacy in the decades following her death; became a record promoter and publisher in his own right 
 November 15 – Ron Hynes, 64, Canadian country-folk artist, best known for the songs "Sonny's Dream" and "Cryer's Paradise" (cancer)
 December 6 – Don Chapel, songwriter of hits by George Jones, Conway Twitty, ex-wife Tammy Wynette, and others
 December 7 – Don Pfrimmer, 78, songwriter known for co-writing many modern hits including "Meet in the Middle" and "My Front Porch Looking In" (leukemia)

Hall of Fame inductees

Bluegrass Music Hall of Fame Inductees
 Larry Sparks
 Bill Keith

Country Music Hall of Fame inductees
 Jim Ed Brown and The Browns (Jim Ed (1934–2015), Bonnie (1937–2016); and Maxine (1932–2019). 
 Grady Martin (1929–2001)
 The Oak Ridge Boys (multiple members – currently Duane Allen (born 1943), Joe Bonsall (born 1948), William Lee Golden (born 1939) and Richard Sterban (born 1943)).

Canadian Country Music Hall of Fame inductees
 Dianne Leigh
 Elizabeth "Ma" Henning

Major awards

Academy of Country Music
(presented April 3, 2016 in Las Vegas)
Entertainer of the Year – Jason Aldean
Top Male Vocalist – Chris Stapleton
Top Female Vocalist – Miranda Lambert
Top Vocal Group – Little Big Town
Top Vocal Duo – Florida Georgia Line
New Male Vocalist – Chris Stapleton
New Female Vocalist – Kelsea Ballerini
New Vocal Duo or Group – Old Dominion
Album of the Year – Traveller, Chris Stapleton
Single Record of the Year – "Die a Happy Man", Thomas Rhett
Song of the Year – "Nobody to Blame", Chris Stapleton
Video of the Year – "Mr. Misunderstood", Eric Church
Vocal Event of the Year – "Smokin' and Drinkin'", Miranda Lambert feat. Little Big Town

ACM Honors
 Career Achievement Award – Alabama
 Crystal Milestone Award – Loretta Lynn
 Gene Weed Special Achievement Award – Luke Bryan
 Jim Reeves International Award – Eric Church
 Mae Boren Axton Award – Barry Adelman
 Mae Boren Axton Award – Tim DuBois
 Poet's Award – Bob McDill
 Poet's Award – Felice and Boudleaux Bryant
 Songwriter of the Year – Luke Laird

Americana Music Honors & Awards 
Album of the Year – Down Where the Spirit Meets the Bone (Lucinda Williams)
Artist of the Year – Sturgill Simpson
Duo/Group of the Year – The Mavericks
Song of the Year – "Turtles All the Way Down" (Sturgill Simpson)
Emerging Artist of the Year – Shakey Graves
Instrumentalist of the Year – John Leventhal
Spirit of Americana/Free Speech Award – Buffy Sainte-Marie
Lifetime Achievement: Trailblazer – Don Henley
Lifetime Achievement: Songwriting – Gillian Welch and David Rawlings
Lifetime Achievement: Performance – Los Lobos
Lifetime Achievement: Instrumentalist – Ricky Skaggs

American Music Awards
(presented November 22 in Los Angeles)
Favorite Country Male Artist – Luke Bryan
Favorite Country Female Artist – Carrie Underwood
Favorite Country Band/Duo/Group – Florida Georgia Line
Favorite Country Album – Anything Goes, Florida Georgia Line

ARIA Awards 
(presented in Sydney on November 26, 2015)
Best Country Album – All Hell Breaks Loose (Shane Nicholson)

Canadian Country Music Association
(presented September 13 in Halifax)
Fans' Choice Award – Johnny Reid
Male Artist of the Year – Gord Bamford
Female Artist of the Year – Jess Moskaluke
Group or Duo of the Year – High Valley
Songwriter(s) of the Year – "Where a Farm Used to Be", written by Gord Bamford, Buddy Owens and Phil O'Donnell
Single of the Year – "Where a Farm Used to Be", Gord Bamford
Album of the Year – Lifted, Dallas Smith
Top Selling Album – Crash My Party, Luke Bryan
Top Selling Canadian Album – Yoan, Yoan
CMT Video of the Year – "Upside Down", Dean Brody
Rising Star Award – Madeline Merlo
Roots Artist or Group of the Year – Lindi Ortega
Interactive Artist of the Year – Brett Kissel

Country Music Association
(presented November 4 in Nashville)
Single of the Year – "Girl Crush", Little Big Town
Song of the Year – "Girl Crush", Liz Rose, Hillary Lindsey, Lori McKenna
Vocal Group of the Year – Little Big Town
New Artist of the Year – Chris Stapleton
Album of the Year – Traveller, Chris Stapleton
Musician of the Year – Mac McAnally
Vocal Duo of the Year – Florida Georgia Line
Music Video of the Year – "Girl in a Country Song", Maddie & Tae
Male Vocalist of the Year – Chris Stapleton
Female Vocalist of the Year – Miranda Lambert
Musical Event of the Year – "Raise 'Em Up", Keith Urban and Eric Church
Entertainer of the Year – Luke Bryan

CMT Music Awards
(presented June 10 in Nashville)
Video of the Year – "Something in the Water", Carrie Underwood
Male Video of the Year – "Play It Again", Luke Bryan
Female Video of the Year – "Something in the Water", Carrie Underwood
Group Video of the Year – "Bartender", Lady Antebellum
Duo Video of the Year – "Dirt", Florida Georgia Line
Breakthrough Video of the Year – "Leave the Night On", Sam Hunt
Collaborative Video of the Year – "Somethin' Bad", Miranda Lambert with Carrie Underwood
Performance of the Year – "Turn the Page", Bob Seger and Jason Aldean from CMT Crossroads

CMT Artists of the Year
 (presented on December 2, 2015)
Luke Bryan
Florida Georgia Line
Sam Hunt
Little Big Town
Blake Shelton

Grammy Awards
(presented February 15, 2016 in Los Angeles)
Best Country Solo Performance – "Traveller" (Chris Stapleton)
Best Country Duo/Group Performance – "Girl Crush" (Little Big Town)
Best Country Song – "Girl Crush" (Hillary Lindsey, Lori McKenna, Liz Rose)
Best Country Album – Traveller (Chris Stapleton)
Best Bluegrass Album – The Muscle Shoals Recordings (The SteelDrivers)
Best Americana Album – Something More Than Free (Jason Isbell)
Best American Roots Song – "24 Frames" (Jason Isbell)
Best American Roots Performance – "See That My Grave Is Kept Clean" (Mavis Staples)
Best Roots Gospel Album – Still Rockin' My Soul (The Fairfield Four)

Juno Awards
(presented April 3, 2016 in Calgary)
Country Album of the Year – Gypsy Road, Dean Brody

References

Other links
 Country Music Association
 Inductees of the Country Music Hall of Fame

Country
Country music by year